Alachaur or Allachaur is a village in Shaheed Bhagat Singh Nagar district of Punjab State, India. Most of the families of the village are well settled in abroad. The village is administrated by Sarpanch an elected representative of the village.

Demography 
As of 2011, Alachaur has a total number of 263 houses and population of 1218 of which 596 include are males while 622 are females according to the report published by Census India in 2011. The literacy rate of Alachaur is 84.47%, higher than the state average of 75.84%. The population of children under the age of 6 years is 117 which is 9.61% of total population of Alachaur, and child sex ratio is approximately 857 as compared to Punjab state average of 846.

Most of the people are from Schedule Caste which constitutes 23.65% of total population in Alachaur. The town does not have any Schedule Tribe population so far.

As per the report published by Census India in 2011, 328 people were engaged in work activities out of the total population of Alachaur which includes 278 males and 50 females. According to census survey report 2011, 94.82% workers describe their work as main work and 5.18% workers are involved in Marginal activity providing livelihood for less than 6 months.

Education 
The village has a Punjabi medium, co-ed government high school. The schools provide mid-day meal as per Indian Midday Meal Scheme. The school provide free education to children between the ages of 6 and 14 as per Right of Children to Free and Compulsory Education Act. KC Engineering College and Doaba Khalsa Trust Group Of Institutions are the nearest colleges.

Landmarks 
Gurudawara Akal Bunga, Gurudwara Sahib and Khanga Peer are religious sites in the village. A religious fair held at the Gurdwara annually, which attended by people of all religions.

Transport 

See also 
List of villages in India

References

External links 
 Tourism of Punjab 
 Census of Punjab
 Locality Based PINCode

Villages in Shaheed Bhagat Singh Nagar district